= Swiftian =

Swiftian may refer to:

- Anglo-Irish satirist and essayist Jonathan Swift or his works
- American singer-songwriter Taylor Swift or her works
